Gábor Tánczos (22 January 1872 – 11 August 1953) was a Hungarian politician, who served as Minister of Foreign Affairs in 1919 for few days. From 1907 to 1909 he was a military attaché in Belgrade, between 1914 and 1915 in Athens, and between 1915 and 1916 in Bucharest. At the end of the war he served as Emperor-King Charles I's adjutant. He was the Hungarian-Czechoslovakian border establishing commission's Hungarian border commissioner.

References
 Magyar Életrajzi Lexikon

1872 births
1953 deaths
Politicians from Budapest
Hungarian soldiers
Foreign ministers of Hungary